Askold Anatolievich Makarov (3 May 1925 – 25 December 2000) was a Russian ballet dancer and ballet professor, leading soloist at the Kirov Ballet during the 1960s and early 1970s. Director of the Saint-Petesburg State Academic Ballet from 1976 to 2000. Awarded with: State Prize of the USSR (1951) and People's Artist of the USSR (1983).

Askold Makarov became director of the theater Choreographic Miniatures after the Leonid Yakobson's death in 1975.

Sources

1925 births
2000 deaths
People from Rzhevsky District
People from Rzhevsky Uyezd
Russian male ballet dancers
Ballet teachers
Mariinsky Ballet first soloists
20th-century Russian ballet dancers
Burials at Nikolskoe Cemetery